The Never Ending Tour is the popular name for Bob Dylan's endless touring schedule since June 7, 1988.

Background
The 2000 Never Ending Tour started in North America with two performances in one day at the Anaheim Sun Theatre in Anaheim, California on March 10. The tour closed in Denver, Colorado on April 6 at the Fillmore Auditorium. This was Dylan's ninth concert in Denver.

On May 6 Dylan started a nineteen date European spring tour performing seven concerts in Germany, five concerts in Italy, three concerts in Sweden, one concert in Denmark, Norway, Finland and Switzerland. Dylan performed in Horsens, Denmark on May 21, Dylan's first performance in the city.

After finishing his brief European tour Dylan returned to North America to perform 31 concerts the United States and a single concert in Toronto, Ontario, Canada. Dylan also performed a further seventeen concerts in the United States in late October and November.

After finishing the United States summer tour Dylan and his band returned to Europe to perform a further eighteen concerts, mainly taking place in the United Kingdom. He also performed two concerts in Ireland, three concerts in Germany, one concert in the Netherlands and Belgium as well as two concerts in France. Dylan performed the first concert of the tour at Vicar Street in Dublin, Ireland which was added due to high demand for tickets at the Point Depot show the following day.

The tour came to a close in Towson, Maryland on November 19 at the Towson State University after one-hundred and ten shows.

Tour dates

Festivals and other miscellaneous performances
Dylan performed two shows that evening.

Cancellations and rescheduled shows

References

External links

BobLinks – Comprehensive log of concerts and set lists
Bjorner's Still on the Road – Information on recording sessions and performances

Bob Dylan concert tours
2000 concert tours